Janusz Kołodziej may refer to:
Janusz Kołodziej (politician) (born 1959), Polish politician
Janusz Kołodziej (speedway rider) (born 1984), Polish motorcycle speedway rider